Fredrik Aasmundrud Gulbrandsen (born 10 September 1992) is a Norwegian professional footballer who plays as a forward for Süper Lig club Adana Demirspor.

Club career

Lillestrøm
Gulbrandsen began his career with his hometown club Lillestrøm. He made his debut in the Norwegian top division against IK Start in May 2009, as the youngest Lillestrøm player ever. In March 2010, he was loaned out to Lyn for the duration of the spring season. While with Lyn he made 11 appearances and scored 2 goals. He returned to 
Lillestrøm for the 2011 season, and on 3 July 2011 scored his first goal for the club in a 2–1 victory over Viking FK.

Molde
On 15 July 2013, Gulbrandsen signed a contract with Molde. He had a breakthrough season in 2014 appearing in 29 matches and scored 14 goals in all competitions, helping Molde to their first league and cup double in club history. On 23 November 2014, Gulbrandsen opened the scoring for Molde in a 2–0 victory over Odd in the 2014 Norwegian Football Cup Final. After an injury plagued 2015 season, Gulbrandsen regained his form scoring 4 goals in 9 matches to start the 2016 season, drawing the attention of top European sides.

Red Bull Salzburg

On 16 June 2016, he moved to Red Bull Salzburg and signed a contract until 2019. On 23 July 2016, he scored his first goal for Red Bull Salzburg in his league debut in a 3–1 loss to Sturm Graz. On 23 October 2016 Gulbrandsen scored his second goal for Salzburg in a 5–1 victory over SKN St. Pölten.

On 10 March 2017, Gulbrandsen joined Major League Soccer side New York Red Bulls on a one-year loan deal. He was released on 6 June 2017.

During the 2017–18 season, Salzburg had their best ever European campaign. They finished top of their Europa League group, for a record fourth time, before beating Real Sociedad and Borussia Dortmund thus making their first ever appearance in the UEFA Europa League semi-final. On 3 May 2018, he played in the Europa League semi-finals as Olympique de Marseille played out a 1–2 away loss but a 3–2 aggregate win to secure a place in the 2018 UEFA Europa League Final.

İstanbul Başakşehir
On 25 June 2019, he has signed three-year contract with Turkish Süper Lig club İstanbul Başakşehir.

Adana Demirspor
On 8 September 2022, he has signed two-year contract with Turkish Süper Lig club Adana Demirspor.

International career
Gulbrandsen made his debut for the Norway national football team on 27 August 2014 in a friendly against the United Arab Emirates in Stavanger. He started the match, which ended goalless, but was substituted at half time for fellow debutant Fredrik Ulvestad. His competitive debut came on 16 November, replacing Tarik Elyounoussi in added time at the end of a 1–0 away win against Azerbaijan in UEFA Euro 2016 qualifying.

Personal life
He is the son of footballer Tom Gulbrandsen who played for Lillestrøm and SV Ried.

Career statistics

Honours
Molde
Tippeligaen: 2014
Norwegian Cup: 2013, 2014

Red Bull Salzburg
Austrian Bundesliga: 2016–17, 2017–18
Austrian Cup: 2016–17

İstanbul Başakşehir
Süper Lig: 2019–20

References

External links

1992 births
Living people
People from Lillestrøm
Sportspeople from Viken (county)
Norwegian footballers
Association football forwards
Lillestrøm SK players
Lyn Fotball players
Molde FK players
FC Red Bull Salzburg players
New York Red Bulls players
İstanbul Başakşehir F.K. players
Eliteserien players
Norwegian First Division players
Austrian Football Bundesliga players
Major League Soccer players
Süper Lig players
Norway youth international footballers
Norway under-21 international footballers
Norway international footballers
Norwegian expatriate footballers
Expatriate footballers in Austria
Expatriate footballers in Turkey
Expatriate soccer players in the United States
Norwegian expatriate sportspeople in Austria
Norwegian expatriate sportspeople in Turkey
Norwegian expatriate sportspeople in the United States